was a Japanese critic and author, also known under the pseudonym .

Biography
Fukuchi Gen'ichirō was born in Nagasaki, Japan. He traveled Europe as a translator, and in 1874, became a main writer for the Tokyo Nichi Nichi Shimbun newspaper. In 1882, he formed the Constitutional Imperial Rule Party.

References

Further reading

 

Japanese male writers
1841 births
1906 deaths
Japanese journalists
Male dramatists and playwrights
Male journalists
19th-century Japanese dramatists and playwrights
19th-century journalists
19th-century male writers
Writers from Nagasaki Prefecture
People from Nagasaki
Members of the Iwakura Mission
Members of the First Japanese Embassy to Europe